Skakavac Waterfall may refer to:
Skakavac Waterfall, Perućica
Skakavac Waterfall (Mrkonjić Grad)